Uleiorchis is a genus of myco-heterotrophic flowering plants from the orchid family, Orchidaceae. There are two known species, native to Central and South America.

Uleiorchis liesneri Carnevali & I.Ramírez - Venezuela
Uleiorchis ulei (Cogn.) Handro - Costa Rica, Honduras, Panama, Colombia, Venezuela, Guyana, French Guiana, Brazil, Peru, possibly Ecuador

See also 
 List of Orchidaceae genera

References

External links 

Myco-heterotrophic orchids
Gastrodieae genera
Gastrodieae